De'Alonzio Jackson (born 31 October 1988), known as DJ Jackson, is an American Brazilian jiu-jitsu practitioner and mixed martial artist based in Thailand. He is a multiple Brazilian jiu-jitsu world champions in IBJJF, ADCC, Pan American, Brazilian National and COPA de Bangkok. Jackson is the first African-American world Brazilian jiu-jitsu champion.

Background 
Jackson was born on 31 October 1988 in Maryland. He started sport with wrestling at DeMatha Catholic High School.

Brazilian jiu-jitsu career 
When DJ Jackson started practicing Brazilian jiu-jitsu on the Team Lloyd Irvin, he immediately caught the attention of his coach, Lloyd Irvin. He entered the competition very soon at the request of his coach. In a short time, he shone in prestigious competitions and eliminated all of his opponents. His high level of athleticism earned him a black belt in 2012 in less than four years.

Mixed martial arts career 
While practicing Brazilian jiu-jitsu, Jackson decided to practice and compete in mixed martial arts. He fought four times between 2015 and 2016, which resulted in four victories, including two submissions.

Coaching career 
Since 2019, Jackson has been an official Brazilian jiu-jitsu and mixed martial arts coach in Thailand. Under his leadership, his students, including Stamp Fairtex, Arash Mardani, Reza Goodary and Mark Abelardo, have won several international medals in important competitions including the Siam Cup BJJ and COPA de Bangkok.

Achievements

World No-Gi Brazilian Jiu-Jitsu Championship 
  2015 California, -79.5 kg  Black belt, No-Gi
  2013 California, -79.5 kg  Black belt, No-Gi
  2012 California, -79.5 kg  Black belt, No-Gi

Pan-American No-Gi Championship 
  2012 California, -98 kg  Black belt, No-Gi

COPA de Bangkok 
  2019 Bangkok, -82.3 kg  Black belt, No-Gi
  2019 Bangkok, -85 kg  Black belt, Gi
  2019 Bangkok, Open weight  Black belt, No-Gi
  2019 Bangkok, Open weight  Black belt, Gi

Mixed martial arts record 

|-
|Win
|align=center|4-0
|Bassil Hafez
|Decision (unanimous)
|CFFC 61 - Anyanwu vs. Pinto
|
|align=center|3		
|align=center|5:00
|New Jersey, United States
|
|-
|Win
|align=center|3-0
|Stacey Anderson
|Submission (rear-naked choke)
|SF - Shogun Fights 14
|
|align=center|1
|align=center|2:40
|Virginia, United States
|
|-
|Win
|align=center|2-0
|Piankhi Zimmerman
|Decision (unanimous)
|SF - Shogun Fights 13
|
|align=center|3
|align=center|5:00
|Maryland, United States
|
|-
|Win
|align=center|1-0
|Roy Smith
|Submission (rear-naked choke)
|Fire & Ice Fighting Championships - Fight for the Troops
|
|align=center|1
|align=center|0:45
|Maryland, United States
|
|-

Grappling record

See also 
	

 World No-Gi Brazilian Jiu-Jitsu Championship
 COPA de Bangkok

References

External links 
 De'Alonzio Jackson's profile at Sherdog
 
 

1988 births
Living people
American practitioners of Brazilian jiu-jitsu
People awarded a black belt in Brazilian jiu-jitsu
Welterweight mixed martial artists
Mixed martial artists utilizing wrestling
Mixed martial artists utilizing Brazilian jiu-jitsu
African-American mixed martial artists
American male mixed martial artists
American male sport wrestlers
African-American Christians
21st-century African-American sportspeople
20th-century African-American people
World No-Gi Brazilian Jiu-Jitsu Championship medalists